The Kamov Ka-8 "Иркутянин", (Irkutyanin - from Irkutsk), was a small, single-seat Soviet helicopter that first flew in 1947. It was a precursor of the Ka-10. The Ka-8 was powered by a 27 hp M-76 engine, boosted to 45 hp by using alcohol for fuel. It was derived from a previous Kamov design, the KA-17.

Description
Like the KA-17 design, the KA-8 featured twin coaxial, contra-rotating rotors, which meant that a tail rotor wasn't needed. While Kamov was famous at the time for his autogyros, the Soviet government was more interested in helicopters so he designed the KA-8 as a flying motorcycle (vozdushnii mototsikl). The NACA-230 blades were laminate wood covered by fabric and attached to a metal hub. The drag and flap hinges were driven by superimposed swash plates that the pilot directly controlled. The engine and fuel tank were located at the front, a tail fin (later changed to a rudder) was installed at the rear, and pontoons were used for landing. The frame was made from welded steel tubing. The original handlebar controls were replaced with vertical collective and cyclic levers and the pontoons were narrowed after being flown and evaluated by Mikhail Gurov in 1947.

Specifications

References

Notes

Bibliography

 Apostolo, Giorgio. The Illustrated Encyclopedia of Helicopters. New York: Bonanza Books, 1984. .

Kamov aircraft
1940s Soviet military utility aircraft
Ka-08
Coaxial rotor helicopters
Single-engined piston helicopters